{{DISPLAYTITLE:C6H13O10P}}
The molecular formula C6H13O10P (molar mass: 276.134 g/mol) may refer to:

 2-Carboxy--arabitinol 1-phosphate
 6-Phosphogluconic acid

Molecular formulas